Matthew Buntine (born 19 October 1993) is a professional Australian rules footballer who last played for the Greater Western Sydney Giants in the Australian Football League (AFL). He was drafted with pick five in the 2011 national draft. He was delisted in 2021.

References

External links

1993 births
Living people
Greater Western Sydney Giants players
Australian rules footballers from Victoria (Australia)
Dandenong Stingrays players